Severe Tropical Cyclone Tessi was a small but potent tropical cyclone that caused extensive damage along the coast of North Queensland in early April 2000. The ninth cyclone and fourth severe tropical cyclone of the 1999–2000 Australian region cyclone season, Tessi developed on 1 April from a persistent trough of low pressure in the Coral Sea and slowly tracked west-southwestward. Tessi was an unusually compact storm that strengthened rapidly just before landfall, peaking as a Category 3 severe tropical cyclone on the Australian tropical cyclone intensity scale with 10-minute average maximum winds of 140 km/h (85 mph). Around 22:00 UTC on 2 April, Tessi moved ashore about 75 km (45 mi) northwest of Townsville and rapidly diminished as it progressed inland.

Tessi's strong winds caused widespread damage along the coast from Ingham to Ayr, most notably around Townsville, where many trees were uprooted and 50,000 homes lost electricity. Buildings and vehicles were damaged by the winds and fallen trees, and roadways surrounding the city became impassable. Hundreds of Castle Hill residents were forced to leave their homes, and many structures were inundated with mud and debris. The landslide dislodged a large boulder uphill from several residences, creating a period of local concern before workers stabilised the slope. Along the coast, the storm wrecked boats and eroded beaches. Total damage in Townsville was estimated to be at least $50 million (2000 AUD), and the name Tessi was later retired due to the cyclone's impacts.

Meteorological history

Cyclone Tessi originated in a northwest–southeast oriented trough of low pressure that developed in the Coral Sea at the end of March 2000. Similar conditions would lead to the genesis of Cyclone Vaughan in the same region just days later. At that point, the Bureau of Meteorology's (BoM) Tropical Cyclone Warning Centre in Brisbane operationally identified the system as a tropical low and began issuing gale warnings. At 00:00 UTC on 2 April, the Joint Typhoon Warning Center (JTWC) designated the system 22S. Diffluence from an anticyclone to the east promoted favourable outflow in the upper levels of the atmosphere, and a closed centre of circulation rapidly formed. As the disturbance tracked southwestward around the periphery of a mid-level ridge to the south, its appearance on satellite imagery continued to improve, with distinct rainbands wrapping around the centre.

Tessi was an extremely small tropical system, described as a "midget cyclone," that continued to contract due to rising environmental air pressures as it approached the coast. Additionally, the storm's wind field was lopsided, with gale-force winds extending  to the south of the centre but only  to the north. Nonetheless, the parent trough provided an area of generally weak inhibiting wind shear, allowing the cyclone to quickly strengthen. This made it a Category 3 severe tropical cyclone on the Australian cyclone scale. The JTWC estimated weaker 1-minute winds of 95 km/h (60 mph). Land-based observations and radar imagery suggested that the storm was more intense than indicated by its satellite presentation. Upon moving ashore, the cyclone slowed and rapidly deteriorated, and it dissipated by 00:60 UTC on 3 April. The small cyclone's rapid strengthening before landfall was generally not well-forecast by weather models; in particular, the ECMWF model anticipated that the system would degenerate back into an open trough before moving ashore.

Impact

While moving inland, Tessi produced strong winds and very heavy rainfall. Wind damage was widespread but generally of a minor nature, extending from Ingham to Ayr along the coast of Queensland. New daily and monthly total rainfall records were set in Townsville, where  of rainfall was recorded in a 24-hour period. In and around Townsville, the powerful gusts brought down thousands of trees, some of which struck and damaged buildings and caravans. Multiple roofs sustained damage, and fallen power lines left 50,000 households without electricity. By two days after the storm, only about half of the outages had been restored. Many roads were damaged or obstructed by debris, leaving the city isolated for a time. After Tessi weakened below the tropical cyclone threshold, its remnants continued to produce heavy rainfall.

The most intense winds were likely confined to the sparsely populated shoreline east of Mutarnee; there, tree damage was significant, and a few beach huts were damaged. Along the coast, rough seas washed ashore and wrecked several boats. The Port of Townsville sustained $1.1 million in damage, which included the destruction of breakwaters. Despite  of sand being displaced from the base of the scarp, the changes to the beach were considered to be within acceptable parameters of the ongoing beach nourishment project. Tessi also had a serious impact on seagrass meadows, such as those in Cockle Bay. Streets on the island were littered with debris, and residents were left with limited supplies of drinking water. 

The torrential rainfall caused extensive flash flooding and triggered a large landslide in a residential neighbourhood in Castle Hill, a suburb of Townsville. Two homes were destroyed while many others were invaded by large volumes of mud and debris. A mansion belonging to the owner of the Townsville Crocodiles was among the most severely impacted properties, being almost entirely buried under the landslide. Around 400 residents of the community were forced to evacuate nearly 140 homes, and 10 individuals were hospitalised with acute stress. With fears of additional rainfall from Cyclone Vaughan, dozens of engineers rushed to secure a large , 150-tonne boulder that the landslide dislodged and left resting precariously on the hillside above several homes. After workers spent more than 24 hours reinforcing the boulder and removing other loose debris from the hillside, the immediate threat was alleviated. However, concerns about the stability of the slope and disputes over the funding necessary for ongoing maintenance still lingered as of 2012. As the landslide occurred in an affluent neighbourhood, some residents feared the incident would lower their property values. In addition to the Castle Hill landslide, Tessi's rainfall induced smaller rock falls and debris flows throughout susceptible areas of Townsville.

Aftermath
During and after the storm, the State Emergency Service responded to 530 calls for assistance. While attempting to repair a damaged power line, two Queensland Rail workers received electrical shocks, with one of them being severely injured. As emergency workers were preoccupied with the aftermath of Tessi, burglars looted 80 homes and businesses, as well as flooded vehicles and damaged yachts, in Townsville. In the aftermath of the cyclone, some 400 Townsville City Council workers embarked on clean-up efforts. Vegetation debris in Townsville was collected and processed into  of mulch, which was used in local botanical gardens like The Palmetum. By 6 April, local insurers had received 3,000 claims for property damage. Townsville mayor Tony Mooney initially estimated damage to private property from Tessi at $100 million, and judged the destruction more severe than that of the 1998 Townsville floods. Later, a post-storm assessment placed the damage total closer to $50 million. After the season ended, the name Tessi was retired from the Australian tropical cyclone naming list due to the cyclone's "negative impact."

See also

 Climate of Australia
 List of tropical cyclones
 Cyclone Althea
 Cyclone Larry
 Cyclone Yasi

References

External links

Tropical cyclones in Queensland
1999–2000 Australian region cyclone season
Cyclone Tessi
Retired Australian region cyclones
Category 3 Australian region cyclones
2000s in Queensland
Tessi